From Whence Came the Cowboy is the fifth album from the Sons of the San Joaquin and the third and final for the Warner Western label.  It is the first to feature mostly original songs instead of relying on Sons of the Pioneers songs as they had for their prior releases.

Track listing

Personnel

Sons of the San Joaquin

Jack Hannah
Joe Hannah
Lon Hannah

Additional personnel

Mark Casstevens, Richard O'Brien, Ronnie Brooks - guitars
Rob Hajacos - fiddle
Joey Miskulin - accordion
Craig Nelson - acoustic bass
Ray Appleton - harmonica, tambourine
Mollie O'Brien - vocal, "Prairie Girl"
Carl Gorodetzky, Pamela Sixfin - violins
Kristin Wilkinson - viola
Bob Mason - cello
Dave Hanson - string arrangements

Production

Joey Miskulin - producer
Reno Kling - A&R
Recorded at: 
Nightingale Studio, Nashville, TN
Gary Paczosa - engineer
The Dog House, Nashville, TN
Toby Seay - engineer
Mixed at:
The Dog House, Nashville, TN
Gary Paczosa - mixer
Joey Miskulin - mixer
Toby Seay - second engineer
Sandy "Dita" Jenkins - second engineer
Mastered at:
The Final Stage, Nashville, TN
Randy Leroy - mastering, editing
Scott O'Malley, Dane Scott, Steve Weaver - artist representation
Simon Levy - art direction, design
Garrett Rittenberry - design
Adam Jahiel - photography

Notes
"Great American Cowboy" originally appeared as the title track of an earlier Sons album.

External links
Official site

1995 albums
Sons of the San Joaquin albums